Pomeroy is a census-designated place (CDP) in Sadsbury Township, Chester County, Pennsylvania, United States. The population was 401 at the 2010 census.

It was once the northern terminus of the Pomeroy and Newark Railroad.

Geography
Pennsylvania Route 372 passes through the center of the village, connecting Coatesville  to the east with Parkesburg  to the west.

Demographics

References

Census-designated places in Chester County, Pennsylvania
Census-designated places in Pennsylvania